Michalis Giannatos (11 July 1941 – 17 September 2013), alternatively spelled as Michael Yannatos, was a Greek actοr.

Ηe was born in (Constantinople), Turkey. He left the city for Greece in 1964 during the long expulsion of Istanbul Greeks.

Career
He studied in Konstantinos Demopoulos' school of drama and first appeared as a professional actor in Georgios Zervoulakos' film Oi stigmatismenoi (Greek: Οι στιγματισμένοι) in 1966. When still a student, he participated in the theatrical play Capetan Michalis (Greek: Καπετάν Μιχάλης) next to Manos Katrakis.

During his long cinematic career, he appeared in close to 100 films, television series and plays. He was a regular in Theodoros Angelopoulos films since he was one of the director's favorite actors. After Megalexandros (Greek: Μεγαλέξανδρος) in 1981, Angelopoulos was always calling him to play in his movies.

He was fluent in five languages; Greek, Turkish, French, Italian and Spanish. Due to that, he appeared in many international productions, including Midnight Express, Captain Corelli's Mandolin, Munich and more. He worked next to great actors such as Anthony Quinn, John Hurt, Nicolas Cage, Penélope Cruz, Christian Bale, Eric Bana and Daniel Craig.

He also played in the film A Touch of Spice [Greek title: Politiki kouzina (Greek: Πολίτικη Κουζίνα)] by Tassos Boulmetis and in the European co-production Le Dernier Seigneur des Balkans.

Personal life
Giannatos was married to Chaido whom he was with until the day he died. They have three children together; Gerasimos (born in 1979), Ioannis (born in 1980) and Maria (born in 1982).

Since 1979, when his first son was born, Giannatos was working night shifts as a receptionist at the Hotel Caravel. He needed the job so he could take care of his family, while at the same time he was working as an actor every time he had the chance. His son Gerasimos said: "His main job was receptionist. With that job we made it through. He was working from 1979 when I was born till 1996 as a receptionist".

In an interview to Giannis Kasapis in 2012, Giannatos said that he loved classical music: "Classical music is the crown of music. Let me tell you how I first loved it. At my school in  Constantinople I had an Italian classmate who asked me if I had ever heard classical music. I said no and she invited me to her house. She played one of Chopin's Polonaises...I froze! I heard them all! Since then I became a devotee". Giannatos also stated that he was hearing Greek songs as well, Stelios Kazantzidis and rebetiko, and sometimes even flamenco, tango or csárdás. In the same interview he said that he loved the three ancient Greek tragedians — Aeschylus, Sophocles and Euripides — and of course Aristophanes. Also Hemingway and Agatha Christie.

Death
Giannatos died on 17 September 2013 at the age of 72 due to a heart attack, while watching a football match with friends. As his son said, no one of his friends realized that he was gone, till the moment someone called him and he didn't respond.

The Greek Minister of Culture and Sports expressed his condolence to Giannatos family while stating: "Michalis Giannatos was an exquisite actor who played in many important Greek, but also foreign, movies. But he was also one of those artists and, deep down, one of those people who are proving every day that it's not necessary to have the main part of a movie to be a protagonist".

Filmography

Film

Television

References

External links
 
Actor entry at ishow.gr (mostly in Greek but also some in English)

1941 births
2013 deaths
Constantinopolitan Greeks
Greek male actors
Male actors from Istanbul